Salt Lagoon Islands Conservation Park is a protected area covering two islands and some adjoining waters in Salt Lagoon at the south east extent of Lake Alexandrina in South Australia about  south-west of Narrung.  

It was declared for its significance as follows:These two small islands are one of the main breeding sites for a number of the larger water birds in South Australia.  Species known to breed there include two species of spoonbill, three species of egret, four species of cormorant, three species of ibis and the Nankeen night heron.  

The conservation park is classified as an IUCN Category Ia protected area.  In 1980, it was  listed on the former Register of the National Estate.

References

External links
Salt Lagoon Islands Conservation Park webpage on protected planet	

Conservation parks of South Australia
Protected areas established in 1967
1967 establishments in Australia
Murray River
South Australian places listed on the defunct Register of the National Estate